Kayleigh Gilbert is an South African actress.

Early life 
Gilbert was born in Ermelo, South Africa.

Education 
In 2012, Gilbert moved to Los Angeles, California. In March 2014, Gilbert graduated from the Lee Strasberg Theatre and Film Institute.

Career
In 2018, she played Tess, the "monstrous daughter" in Reborn.

Gilbert speaks Afrikaans and Zulu, as well as English.

Filmography

Film 
 2014 Baptized by the Weekend - Lindsay Greer.
 2015 There Is Many Like Us - Production Manager, Rena.
 2016 Widows - Karen.
 2017 Break Night - Louly.
 2018 Reborn - Tess Stern.
 2019 Spiral Farm - Horizon.

Television series

References

External links 
 
 Kayleigh Gilbert at rottentomatoes.com

Living people
South African film actresses
Year of birth missing (living people)
People from Ermelo, Netherlands
Lee Strasberg Theatre and Film Institute alumni